A disagreement is the absence of consensus or consent. It can take the form of dissent or controversy.

See also 
 Objection

Broad-concept articles
Consensus
Controversies